Regulator of G-protein signaling 17 is a protein that in humans is encoded by the RGS17 gene.

Function 

This gene encodes a member of the regulator of G-protein signaling family. This protein contains a conserved, 120 amino acid motif called the RGS domain and a cysteine-rich region. The protein attenuates the signaling activity of G-proteins by binding to activated, GTP-bound G alpha subunits and acting as a GTPase activating protein (GAP), increasing the rate of conversion of the GTP to GDP. This hydrolysis allows the G alpha subunits to bind G beta/gamma subunit heterodimers, forming inactive G-protein heterotrimers, thereby terminating the signal. Along with RGS4, RGS9 and RGS14, RGS17 plays an important role in termination of signalling by mu opioid receptors and development of tolerance to opioid analgesic drugs.

Clinical significance 

RGS17 is a putative lung cancer susceptibility gene in the lung cancer associated locus on chromosome 6q in humans.  RGS17 is overexpressed in lung and prostate cancers, induces cAMP production, CREB phosphorylation and CREB responsive gene expression[2].  Expression of RGS17 is required for maintenance of  proliferation in lung tumor cell lines.

References

Further reading